The 2002 Havant Borough Council election took place on 2 May 2002 to elect members of Havant Borough Council in Hampshire, England. The whole council was up for election after boundary changes reduced the number of seats by 4. The Conservative Party gained overall control of the council from no overall control.

Election result
The Conservatives won a majority on the council, taking 23 of the 38 seats on the council. Labour dropped from 11 to 9 seats, while the Liberal Democrats fell to 6 seats from 8 previously. The 3 Independent councillors had stood down at the election, while the boundary changes were reported to have cost Labour 4 seats. Turnout was up on the 2000 election, but dropped to a low of just 14.6% in Warren Park ward.

Ward results

Barncroft

Battins

Bedhampton

Bondsfields

Cowplain

Emsworth

Hart Plain

Hayling East

Hayling West

Purbrook

St. Faiths

Stakes

Warren Park

Waterloo

References

2002 English local elections
Havant Borough Council elections
2000s in Hampshire